McCaffrey, sometimes spelled Caffrey or McCaffery, is an Irish surname. It is found mostly in the Counties Fermanagh, Monaghan, Cavan and Tyrone in the north west of Ireland. Ballymccaffrey is a townland outside Tempo in county Fermanagh. The surname is an Anglicised form of the Gaelic names Mac Gafraidh, Mac Gofraidh, which mean "son of Gafraidh", "son of Gofraidh". The Gaelic names are forms of the Old Norse Guðfróðr. Notable people with the surname include:

People

McCaffary
John McCaffary (1820–1851), murderer

McCaffrey
 Anne McCaffrey (1926–2011), science fiction author
 Billy McCaffrey (born 1971), American basketball player (brother of Ed and uncle of Max and Christian).
 Barry McCaffrey (born 1942), military analyst, former US Army General
 Christian McCaffrey (born 1996), American football player for the San Francisco 49ers (second son of Ed).
 Ed McCaffrey (born 1968), American football player for the New York Giants (1991─1993), San Francisco 49ers (1994), and Denver Broncos (1995─2003); current head coach of the University of Northern Colorado Bears (2020—present). Father of Max, Christian, Dylan and Luke.
 Francis J. McCaffrey (1917–1989), New York politician from the Bronx
 Francis J. McCaffrey, Jr. (1902–1972), New York politician and judge from Brooklyn
 Frank McCaffrey, American college football All-American player
 James McCaffrey (actor) (born 1960), American actor
 James D. McCaffrey (born 1950), software researcher
 Janice McCaffrey (born 1959), Canadian racewalker
 John McCaffrey (disambiguation), several people
 Joel McCaffrey (born 1994), former child star
 Max McCaffrey (born 1994) American football player (first son of Ed).
 Pete McCaffrey (1938–2012), American basketball player
 Stephanie McCaffrey (born 1993), American soccer forward
 Stuart McCaffrey (born 1979), Scottish footballer

Caffrey
 Andrew Augustine Caffrey, United States federal judge
 Bob Caffrey (born 1962), American baseball player
 Colm Caffrey, Irish radio broadcaster
 David Caffrey, Irish film director
 Ernie Caffrey (born 1936), Irish politician
 James J. Caffrey, American Securities and Exchange Committee chairman
 Joe Caffrey, English actor
 John Caffrey (1891–1953), Irish recipient of the Victoria Cross
 John Caffrey, Gaelic footballer
 Mary Caffrey Low (1850–1926), women's education advocate
 Neal Caffrey (born 1977), White Collar television show character
 Paul Caffrey, Gaelic football manager
 Peter Caffrey (1949–2008), Irish actor
 Sean Caffrey (1940–2013), Northern Irish actor
 Stephen Caffrey (born 1975), Irish footballer
 Stephen Caffrey (born 1959), American actor
 Thomas Caffrey (1917–2010), Irish chocolatier

Caffery
 John Caffery, born Fermanagh County Ireland 1670. Emigrated to Virginia 1691. Member Virginia House of Burgesses. Great Grandfather of Capt. John Caffery.
 Capt. John Caffery, Sheriff Bedford, Virginia. Signatory to the Cumberland Compact. Son-in-law of Col. John Donelson, member Virginia House of Burgesses; co-founder of the City of Nashville, and father-in-law of President Andrew Jackson.
 Donelson Caffery I, Judge 16th JDC Louisiana. Son of Capt. John Caffery. Father of U.S. Senator Donelson Caffery II.
 Donelson Caffery II, Louisiana State Senator. U.S Senator from Louisiana. Grandfather of U.S. Representative Patrick Caffery.
 Jefferson Caffery, U.S.Ambassador to San Salvador, Colombia, Cuba, Brazil, France and Egypt. Assistant Secretary of State. 2nd Cousin of U.S. Senator Donelson Caffery II.
 Donelson Caffery III, District Attorney 16th JDC, Louisiana. Son of Donelson Caffery II. Brother of Edward Caffery and John Caffery. Uncle of Patrick Caffery.
 John Caffery, Louisiana State Senator. Son Of Donelson Caffery II. Brother of Donelson Caffery III and Edward Caffery. Uncle of U.S. Representative Patrick Caffery.
 Edward Caffery, U.S. Counsel to Bucharest, Havana, San Jose, and Niagara Falls. Brother of Donelson Caffery III, John Caffery and Uncle of Patrick Caffery.
 Patrick Caffery, Louisiana State Representative. U.S. Representative from Louisiana. Son of Ralph Earl Caffery. grandson of U.S. Senator Donelson Caffery II

See also 
 McAffrey, surname
 Caffrey's Irish Ale

External links
 Caffrey coat of arms at Araltas

Anglicised Irish-language surnames
Surnames of Irish origin